Herbert Marcuse (July 19, 1898 – July 29, 1979) was a German-American philosopher, social critic, and political theorist, associated with the Frankfurt School of critical theory. Born in Berlin, Marcuse studied at the Humboldt University of Berlin and then at Freiburg, where he received his PhD. He was a prominent figure in the Frankfurt-based Institute for Social Research – what later became known as the Frankfurt School. He was married to Sophie Wertheim (1924–1951), Inge Neumann (1955–1973), and Erica Sherover (1976–1979). In his written works, he criticized capitalism, modern technology, Soviet Communism, and popular culture, arguing that they represent new forms of social control.

Between 1943 and 1950, Marcuse worked in US government service for the Office of Strategic Services (predecessor of the Central Intelligence Agency) where he criticized the ideology of the Communist Party of the Soviet Union in the book Soviet Marxism: A Critical Analysis (1958). In the 1960s and the 1970s, he became known as the preeminent theorist of the New Left and the student movements of West Germany, France, and the United States; some consider him "the Father of the New Left".

His best-known works are Eros and Civilization (1955) and One-Dimensional Man (1964). His Marxist scholarship inspired many radical intellectuals and political activists in the 1960s and 1970s, both in the United States and internationally.

Biography

Early years
Herbert Marcuse was born July 19, 1898 in Berlin, to Carl Marcuse and Gertrud Kreslawsky.  Marcuse's family was a German upper-middle-class Jewish family that was well integrated into German society.  Marcuse's formal education began at Mommsen Gymnasium and continued at the Kaiserin-Augusta Gymnasium in Charlottenburg from 1911 to 1916.  In 1916, he was drafted into the German Army, but only worked in horse stables in Berlin during World War I. He then became a member of a Soldiers' Council that participated in the aborted socialist Spartacist uprising.

In 1919 he attended Humboldt University in Berlin, taking classes for four semesters. In 1920 he transferred to the University of Freiburg to concentrate on German literature, philosophy, politics, and economics. He completed his Ph.D. thesis at the University of Freiburg in 1922 on the German Künstlerroman, after which he moved back to Berlin, where he worked in publishing. Two years later he married Sophie Wertheim, a mathematician.

He returned to Freiburg in 1928 to study with Edmund Husserl and write a habilitation with Martin Heidegger, which was published in 1932 as Hegel's Ontology and the Theory of Historicity (Hegels Ontologie und die Theorie der Geschichtlichkeit). This study was written in the context of the Hegel Renaissance that was taking place in Europe with an emphasis on Georg Wilhelm Friedrich Hegel's ontology of life and history, idealist theory of spirit and dialectic.

Emigration to the United States
In 1932 Marcuse stopped working with Heidegger, who later joined the Nazi Party in 1933. Marcuse understood that he would not qualify as a professor under the Nazi regime as the Nazis seized power and anti-Semitism increased. Marcuse was then hired to work in the Institute of Social Research in the Frankfurt School. The Institute deposited their endowment in Holland in anticipation of the Nazi takeover, so Marcuse never got to actually work in the school. Marcuse began his work with the Institute in Geneva, where a branch office was formed. While a member of the Frankfurt School (also known as the Institute of Social Research), Marcuse developed a model for critical social theory, created a theory of the new stage of state and monopoly capitalism, described the relationships between philosophy, social theory, and cultural criticism, and provided an analysis and critique of German National Socialism. Marcuse worked closely with critical theorists while at the institute. 

After leaving Germany for Switzerland in May 1933, Marcuse emigrated to the United States in June 1934. Marcuse served at the Institute's Columbia University branch from 1934 through 1942. He traveled to Washington, D.C., in 1942, to work for the Office of War Information, and afterward the Office of Strategic Services. Marcuse then went on to teach at Brandeis University and the University of California, San Diego later in his career. In 1940, he became a US citizen and resided in the country until his death in 1979. Although he never returned to Germany to live, he remained one of the major theorists associated with the Frankfurt School, along with Max Horkheimer and Theodor W. Adorno (among others). In 1940 he published Reason and Revolution, a dialectical work studying G. W. F. Hegel and Karl Marx.

World War II
During World War II, Marcuse first worked for the US Office of War Information (OWI) on anti-Nazi propaganda projects. In 1943, he transferred to the Research and Analysis Branch of the Office of Strategic Services (OSS), the precursor to the Central Intelligence Agency.

Directed by the Harvard historian William L. Langer, the Research and Analysis (R&A) Branch was the largest American research institution in the first half of the twentieth century. At its zenith between 1943 and 1945, it employed over twelve hundred, four hundred of whom were stationed abroad. In many respects, it was the site where post-World War II American social science was born, with protégés of some of the most esteemed American university professors, as well as numerous European intellectual émigrés, in its ranks.

In March 1943, Marcuse joined fellow Frankfurt School scholar Franz Neumann in R&A's Central European Section as senior analyst; there he rapidly established himself as "the leading analyst on Germany".

After the dissolution of the OSS in 1945, Marcuse was employed by the US Department of State as head of the Central European section, becoming an intelligence analyst of Nazism. A compilation of Marcuse's reports was published in Secret Reports on Nazi Germany: The Frankfurt School Contribution to the War Effort (2013). He retired after the death of his first wife in 1951.

Post-war
Marcuse first began his teaching career as a political theorist at Columbia University, then at Harvard University in 1952. Marcuse worked at Brandeis University from 1954 to 1965, then at the University of California San Diego from 1965 to 1970. It was during his time at Brandeis that he wrote his most famous work, One-Dimensional Man (1964).

Marcuse was a friend and collaborator of the political sociologist Barrington Moore Jr. and of the political philosopher Robert Paul Wolff, and also a friend of the Columbia University sociology professor C. Wright Mills, one of the founders of the New Left movement. In his "Introduction" to One-Dimensional Man, Marcuse wrote, "I should like to emphasize the vital importance of the work of C. Wright Mills."

In the post-war period, Marcuse rejected the theory of class struggle and the Marxist concern with labor, instead claiming, according to Leszek Kołakowski, that since "all questions of material existence have been solved, moral commands and prohibitions are no longer relevant." He regarded the realization of man's erotic nature as the true liberation of humanity, which inspired the utopias of Jerry Rubin and others.

Marcuse's critiques of capitalist society (especially his 1955 synthesis of Marx and Sigmund Freud, Eros and Civilization, and his 1964 book One-Dimensional Man) resonated with the concerns of the student movement in the 1960s. Because of his willingness to speak at student protests and his essay "Repressive Tolerance" (1965), Marcuse soon became known in the media as "Father of the New Left."  Contending that the students of the sixties were not waiting for the publication of his work to act, Marcuse brushed the media's branding of him as "Father of the New Left" aside lightly, saying "It would have been better to call me not the father, but the grandfather, of the New Left."  His work strongly influenced intellectual discourse on popular culture and scholarly popular culture studies. In particular, he influenced youth because he "spoke their language." He understood the importance of rock and roll, for example, as a symbol for New Left activism. He had many speaking engagements in the US and Western Bloc in the late 1960s and 1970s. He became a close friend and inspirer of the French philosopher André Gorz.

Marcuse defended the arrested East German dissident Rudolf Bahro (author of Die Alternative: Zur Kritik des real existierenden Sozialismus [trans., The Alternative in Eastern Europe]), discussing in a 1979 essay Bahro's theories of "change from within."

Marriages

Marcuse married three times. His first wife was mathematician Sophie Wertheim (1901–1951), whom he married in 1924 and had his first son Peter with in 1928. Before emigrating to New York in 1934, they resided in Freiburg, Berlin, Geneva, and Paris. They lived in Los Angeles/Santa Monica and Washington, D.C. in the 1930s and 1940s. In 1951 Sophie Wertheim passed away due to cancer. He would later marry Inge Neumann (1914–1973), the widow of his close friend Franz Neumann (1900–1954). After his second wife Inge died in 1973, Marcuse married Erica Sherover (1938–1988), a former graduate student at the University of California, in 1976.

Children 
In his first marriage with Sophie Wertheim, they had one son Peter Marcuse born in 1928. Peter Marcuse was a professor emeritus of urban planning at Columbia University located in New York. Although Marcuse didn't have any children with Inge Neumann Marcuse, he helped raise her two sons, Thomas Neumann and Michael Neumann.  Thomas (now Osha) is a Berkeley-based writer, activist, lawyer, and muralist. Michael works as a philosophy professor at Trent University in Peterborough, Ontario, Canada.

Marcuse's granddaughter is the novelist Irene Marcuse and his grandson, Harold Marcuse, is a professor of history at the University of California, Santa Barbara.

Death

On July 29, 1979, ten days after his eighty-first birthday, Marcuse died after suffering a stroke during his trip to Germany. He had just finished speaking at the Frankfurt Römerberggespräche, and was on his way to the Max Planck Institute for the Study of the Scientific-Technical World in Starnberg, on invitation from second-generation Frankfurt School theorist Jürgen Habermas.

In 2003, after his ashes were rediscovered in the United States, they were buried in the Dorotheenstädtischer cemetery in Berlin.

Philosophy and views

Marcuse's concept of repressive desublimation, which has become well-known, refers to his argument that postwar mass culture, with its profusion of sexual provocations, serves to reinforce political repression. If people are preoccupied with inauthentic sexual stimulation, their political energy will be "desublimated"; instead of acting constructively to change the world, they remain repressed and uncritical. Marcuse advanced the prewar thinking of critical theory toward a critical account of the "one-dimensional" nature of bourgeois life in Europe and America. His thinking has been seen as an advance of the concerns of earlier liberal critics such as David Riesman.

Two aspects of Marcuse's work are of particular importance. First, his use of language more familiar from the critique of Soviet or Nazi regimes to characterize developments in the advanced industrial world. Second, his grounding of critical theory in a particular use of psychoanalytic thought.

Marcuse's early "Heideggerian Marxism"
During his years in Freiburg, Marcuse wrote a series of essays that explored the possibility of synthesizing Marxism and Heidegger's fundamental ontology, as begun in the latter's work Being and Time (1927). This early interest in Heidegger followed Marcuse's demand for "concrete philosophy," which, he declared in 1928, "concerns itself with the truth of contemporaneous human existence." These words were directed against the neo-Kantianism of the mainstream, and against both the revisionist and orthodox Marxist alternatives, in which the subjectivity of the individual played little role. Though Marcuse quickly distanced himself from Heidegger following Heidegger's endorsement of Nazism, thinkers such as Jürgen Habermas have suggested that an understanding of Marcuse's later thinking demands an appreciation of his early Heideggerian influence.

Marcuse and Capitalism
Marcuse's analysis of capitalism derives partially from one of Karl Marx's main concepts: Objectification, which under capitalism becomes Alienation. Marx believed that capitalism was exploiting humans; that by producing objects of a certain character, laborers became alienated and this ultimately dehumanized them into functional objects themselves.

Marcuse took this belief and expanded it. He argued that capitalism and industrialization pushed laborers so hard that they began to see themselves as extensions of the objects they were producing. At the beginning of One-Dimensional Man Marcuse writes, "The people recognize themselves in their commodities; they find their soul in their automobile, hi-fi set, split-level home, kitchen equipment," meaning that under capitalism (in consumer society), humans become extensions of the commodities that they buy, thus making commodities extensions of people's minds and bodies. Affluent mass technological societies, he argues, are controlled and manipulated. In societies based upon mass production and mass distribution, the individual worker has become merely a consumer of its commodities and entire commodified way of life. Modern capitalism has created false needs and false consciousness geared to the consumption of commodities: it locks one-dimensional man into the one-dimensional society which produced the need for people to recognize themselves in their commodities.

The very mechanism that ties the individual to his society has changed, and social control is anchored in the new needs that it has produced. Most important of all, the pressure of consumerism has led to the total integration of the working class into the capitalist system. Its political parties and trade unions have become thoroughly bureaucratized and the power of negative thinking or critical reflection has rapidly declined. The working class is no longer a potentially subversive force capable of bringing about revolutionary change.

Marcuse evolved a theory over the years that stated modern technology is repressive naturally. He believed that in both capitalist and communist societies, workers did not question the manner in which they lived due to the mechanism of repression of technological advances. The use of technology allowed people to not be aware of what is occurring around them such as the fact that they might soon be out of their jobs because these technologies are committing their same jobs quicker and cheaper. He claimed the modern-day workers were not as rebellious as before during the Karl Marx era (19th century). They just freely conformed to the system they were under for the sake of satisfying their needs and survival. Since they had conformed, the revolution that Marcuse felt was necessary by the people never happened.

As a result, rather than looking to the workers as the revolutionary vanguard, Marcuse put his faith in an alliance between radical intellectuals and those groups not yet integrated into one-dimensional society, the socially marginalized, the substratum of the outcasts and outsiders, the exploited and persecuted of other ethnicities and other colors, the unemployed and the unemployable. These were the people whose standards of living demanded the ending of intolerable conditions and institutions and whose resistance to one-dimensional society would not be diverted by the system. Their opposition was revolutionary even if their consciousness was not.

The New Left and radical politics 
Many radical scholars and activists were influenced by Marcuse, such as Norman O. Brown, Angela Davis, Charles J. Moore, Abbie Hoffman, Rudi Dutschke, and Robert M. Young (see the List of Scholars and Activists link below). Among those who critiqued him from the left were Marxist-humanist Raya Dunayevskaya, fellow German emigre Paul Mattick, both of whom subjected One-Dimensional Man to a Marxist critique, and Noam Chomsky, who knew and liked Marcuse "but thought very little of his work." Marcuse's 1965 essay "Repressive Tolerance", in which he claimed capitalist democracies can have totalitarian aspects, has been criticized by conservatives. Marcuse argues that genuine tolerance does not permit support for "repression", since doing so ensures that marginalized voices will remain unheard. He characterizes tolerance of repressive speech as "inauthentic". Instead, he advocates a form of tolerance that is intolerant of repressive (namely right-wing) political movements:

Marcuse later expressed his radical ideas through three pieces of writing. He wrote An Essay on Liberation in 1969, in which he celebrated liberation movements such as those in Vietnam, which inspired many radicals. In 1972 he wrote Counterrevolution and Revolt, which argues that the hopes of the 1960s were facing a counterrevolution from the right.

After Brandeis denied the renewal of his teaching contract in 1965, Marcuse taught at the University of California San Diego. In 1968, California Governor Ronald Reagan and other conservatives objected to his reappointment, but the university decided to let his contract run until 1970. He devoted the rest of his life to teaching, writing and giving lectures around the world. His efforts brought him attention from the media, which claimed that he openly advocated violence, although he often clarified that only "violence of defense" could be appropriate, not "violence of aggression". He continued to promote Marxian theory, with some of his students helping to spread his ideas. He published his final work The Aesthetic Dimension in 1979 on the role of art in the process of what he termed "emancipation" from bourgeois society.

Marcuse and Feminism
Marcuse felt that societal reform may be found among the outcast of society, thus he supported movements such as the Feminist movement.

Marcuse was particularly concerned with Feminism near the end of his life, for reasons he explained in a public lecture Marxism and Feminism in 1974. Many themes and ambitions from Marcuse's work found embodiment in socialist feminism, especially ideas developed in Eros and Civilization. It involved changes not only in the structural power relations of society, but in the instinctual drives of individual human beings. Although he regarded women's participation in the labor force as positive, and a necessary condition for women's liberation, Marcuse did not consider it sufficient for true freedom. He hoped for a shift in moral values away from aggressive and masculine qualities towards feminine ones.

Jessica Benjamin and Nancy Chodorow believed that Marcuse's reliance on Freud's drive theory as the source of the desire for societal change is inadequate for both philosophers since he fails to account for the individual's intersubjective growth. Nina Power defends Marcuse against the charge of gender essentialism. Margaret Cerullo was wary of the eroticization of female intellect.

Criticism
Leszek Kołakowski described Marcuse's views as essentially anti-Marxist, in that they ignored Marx's critique of Hegel and discarded the historical theory of class struggle entirely in favor of an inverted Freudian reading of human history where all social rules could and should be discarded to create a "New World of Happiness." Kołakowski concluded that Marcuse's ideal society "is to be ruled despotically by an enlightened group [who] have realized in themselves the unity of Logos and Eros, and thrown off the vexatious authority of logic, mathematics, and the empirical sciences."

The philosopher Alasdair MacIntyre asserted that Marcuse falsely assumed consumers were completely passive, uncritically responding to corporate advertising.  MacIntyre frankly opposed Marcuse.  "It will be my crucial contention in this book," MacIntyre stated, "that almost all of Marcuse's key positions are false. For example, Marcuse was not an orthodox Marxist. Like many of the Frankfurt School, Marcuse wrote of "critical theory" not of "Marxism" and MacIntyre notes a similarity in this to the Right Hegelians, whom Marx attacked. Hence, MacIntyre proposed that Marcuse be regarded as "a pre-Marxist thinker".  According to MacIntyre, Marcuse's assumptions about advanced industrial society were wrong in whole and in part. "Marcuse," concluded MacIntyre, "invokes the great names of freedom and reason while betraying their substance at every important point."

Legacy
Herbert Marcuse appealed to students of the New Left through his emphasis on the power of critical thought and his vision of total human emancipation and a non-repressive civilization. He supported students he felt were subject to the pressures of a commodifying system, and has been regarded as an inspirational intellectual leader. He is also considered among the most influential of the Frankfurt School critical theorists on American culture, due to his studies on student and counter-cultural movements on the 1960s. The legacy of the 1960s, of which Marcuse was a vital part, lives on, and the great refusal is still practiced by oppositional groups and individuals.

Marcuse's thought remains influential in the 21st century. In the introduction to an issue of New Political Science dedicated to Marcuse, Robert Kirsch and Sarah Surak described his influence as, "alive and well, vibrant across multiple fields of inquiry across many areas of social relations." Marcuse's concept of repressive tolerance attracted renewed attention following the 9/11 attacks. Repressive tolerance is also relevant to 21st century campus protests and the Black Lives Matter movement.

Marcuse is not widely remembered outside of contexts where critical theory is taught or referenced. This theory, rooted in Marxist philosophy, remains as one of the main components of Marcuse's influence. 

A fictional representation of Herbert Marcuse appears in the Coen brothers film Hail, Caesar! played by John Bluthal. 

While working as a graduate fellow under Marcuse, Lowell Bergman (who three decades later was portrayed by Al Pacino in The Insider (film)) served as a “de facto bodyguard” for the philosopher during a period when Marcuse was regularly receiving threats of physical violence.

Additional works 

 A Critique of Pure Tolerance (Barrington More Jr., Herbert Marcuse, and Robert Paul Wolff) (1965)
 The Aesthetic Dimension (Herbert Marcuse) (1977)
 An Essay on Liberation (Herbert Marcuse) (1969)

Famous quotes 
 "Art cannot change the world, but it can contribute to changing the consciousness and drives of the men and women who could change the world."
 "The so-called consumer society and the politics of corporate capitalism have created a second nature of man which ties him libidinally and aggressively to the commodity form. The need for possessing, consuming, handling and constantly renewing the gadgets, devices, instruments, engines, offered to and imposed upon the people, for using these wares even at the danger of one's own destruction, has become a “biological” need."
 "One-dimensional thought is systematically promoted by the makers of politics and their purveyors of mass information. Their universe of discourse is populated by self-validating hypotheses which, incessantly and monopolistically repeated, become hypnotic definitions of dictations."
 “The spontaneous reproduction of superimposed needs by the individual does not establish autonomy; it only testifies to the efficacy of the control.”
 “Under the rule of a repressive whole, liberty can be made into a powerful instrument of domination.”

Bibliography
Books
 Hegel's Ontology and the Theory of Historicity (1932), originally written in German, in English 1987.
 Studie über Autorität und Familie (1936) in German, republished 1987, 2005. Marcuse wrote just over 100 pages in this 900-page study.
 Reason and Revolution: Hegel and the Rise of Social Theory (1941) 
 Eros and Civilization: A Philosophical Inquiry into Freud (1955) 
 Soviet Marxism: A Critical Analysis (1958)
 One-Dimensional Man: Studies in the Ideology of Advanced Industrial Society (1964)
 A Critique of Pure Tolerance (1965) Essay "Repressive Tolerance," with additional essays by Robert Paul Wolff and Barrington Moore Jr.
 Negations: Essays in Critical Theory (1968)
 An Essay on Liberation (1969)
 Five Lectures (1969)
 Counterrevolution and Revolt (1972) 
 The Aesthetic Dimension: Toward a Critique of Marxist Aesthetics (1978) 

Essays
 Neue Quellen zur Grundlegung des Historischen Materialismus (1932)
 Repressive Tolerance (1965)
 Liberation (1969)
 On the Problem of the Dialectic (1976)
 Protosocialism and Late Capitalism: Toward a Theoretical Synthesis Based on Bahro's Analysis (1980)

Professionals Marcuse Influenced 

Angela Davis
Jürgen Habermas
Douglas Kellner
Abbie Hoffman 
Norman O. Brown
Lowell Bergman
Nina Power

See also 
 After Marcuse
 Freudo-Marxism
Frankfurt School
Marxism
Socialism
German literature
Critical theory
Capitalism

References

Further reading

Herbert Marcuse
 John Abromeit and W. Mark Cobb, eds. (2004), Herbert Marcuse: A Critical Reader, New York, London: Routledge.
 Andrew Feenberg and William Leiss (2007), The Essential Marcuse: Selected Writings of Philosopher and Social Critic Herbert Marcuse, Boston: Beacon Press.
 Technology, War and Fascism. Collected papers of Herbert Marcuse, volume 1 (London: Routledge 1998)

Criticism and analysis
 C. Fred Alford (1985), Science and Revenge of Nature: Marcuse and Habermas, Gainesville: University of Florida Press.
 Harold Bleich (1977), The Philosophy of Herbert Marcuse, Washington: University Press of America.
 Paul Breines (1970), Critical Interruptions: New Left Perspectives on Herbert Marcuse, New York: Herder and Herder.
 Douglas Kellner (1984), Herbert Marcuse and the Crisis of Marxism. London: Macmillan. .
 Paul Mattick (1972), Critique of Marcuse: One-dimensional man in class society Merlin Press
 Alain Martineau (1986). Herbert Marcuse's Utopia, Harvest House, Montreal.
 .
 .
 Eliseo Vivas (1971), Contra Marcuse, Arlington House, New Rochelle. 
Andrew T. Lamas, Todd Wolfson, and Peter N. Funke, eds (2017),  The Great Refusal: Herbert Marcuse and Contemporary Social Movements. Philadelphia: Temple University Press, 2017.
Kurt H. Wolff and Barrington Moore, Jr., eds (1967), The Critical Spirit. Essays in honor of Herbert Marcuse. Beacon Press, Boston.
 J. Michael Tilley (2011). "Herbert Marcuse: Social Critique, Haecker and Kierkegaardian Individualism" in Kierkegaard's Influence on Social-Political Thought edited by Jon Stewart.

General
 Anthony Elliott and Larry Ray (2003), Key Contemporary Social Theorists.
 Charles Lemert (2010), Social Theory: the Multicultural and Classic Readings.
 Douglas Mann (2008), A Survey of Modern Social Theory.
 Noel Parker and Stuart Sim (1997), A-Z Guide to Modern Social and Political Theorist
"Herbert Marcuse | American philosopher". Encyclopedia Britannica. Retrieved 2021-10-23

External links

 Comprehensive 'Official' Herbert Marcuse Website, by one of Marcuse's grandsons, with full bibliographies of primary and secondary works, and full texts of many important works
 International Herbert Marcuse Society website
 "Herbert Marcuse (on-line) Archive" at the Marxists Internet Archive
 Herbert Marcuse Archive, by Herbert Marcuse Association
  from worldsocialism.org
 "Illuminations: The Critical Theory Project" (detailed biography and essays, by Douglas Kellner).
 Douglas Kellner, "Herbert Marcuse"
 Bernard Stiegler, "Spirit, Capitalism, and Superego"
 "Herbert Marcuse Biography Indonesian" at aprillins.com
 Azurmendi, J. 1969: Pentsalaria eta eragina Jakin, 35: 3–16.
 Goodbye Comrade M obituary of Marcuse by David Widgery, Socialist Review (September 1979).
 Standford Encyclopedia of Philosophy: Herbert Marcuse

1898 births
1979 deaths
20th-century American male writers
20th-century American non-fiction writers
20th-century German philosophers
20th-century German writers
American anti-capitalists
American anti-fascists
American environmentalists
American feminists
American male non-fiction writers
American Marxists
American sociologists
Anti-consumerists
Anti-Stalinist left
Brandeis University faculty
Burials at the Dorotheenstadt Cemetery
Columbia University faculty
Communication scholars
Critics of work and the work ethic
Ecofeminists
Frankfurt School
German anti-capitalists
German anti-fascists
German communists
German environmentalists
German feminists
German male writers
German Marxists
German socialists
German sociologists
Jewish American social scientists
Jewish anti-fascists
Jewish emigrants from Nazi Germany to the United States
Jewish philosophers
Jewish sociologists
Left-libertarians
Libertarian socialists
Male feminists
Marxist humanists
Marxist theorists
New Left
People from the Province of Brandenburg
People of the Office of Strategic Services
People of the United States Office of War Information
Philosophers of technology
Revolution theorists
University of California, San Diego faculty
University of Freiburg alumni
Writers from Berlin
Utopian studies scholars